Quimistán is a town, with a population of 6,270 (2013 census), and a municipality in Santa Bárbara Department of Honduras. The largest town of the municipality is Pinalejo, with a population of 6,478 (2013 census).

Demographics
At the time of the 2013 Honduras census, Quimistán municipality had a population of 47,993. Of these, 89.30% were Mestizo, 6.16% Indigenous (5.92% Lenca), 3.97% White,  0.56% Black or Afro-Honduran and 0.01% others.

Notable people
Mauricio Sabillón, football player

References 

Municipalities of the Santa Bárbara Department, Honduras